The 1927 Bremen state election was held on 13 November 1927 to elect the 120 members of the Bürgerschaft of Bremen.

Results

References

Bremen
Elections in Bremen (state)